Shin Dong-Bin  (born June 11, 1985) is a South Korean football player who since 2009 has played for Yesan FC. He played 1 game in 2008 Samsung Hauzen Cup.

References

1985 births
Living people
South Korean footballers
Jeonbuk Hyundai Motors players
K League 1 players
Association football defenders